Asthmaweed is a common name for several plants and may refer to:

Conyza bonariensis
Conyza floribunda, native to South America